Tetraspanin-7 is a protein that in humans is encoded by the TSPAN7 gene.

The protein encoded by this gene is a member of the transmembrane 4 superfamily, also known as the tetraspanin family. Most of these members are cell-surface proteins that are characterized by the presence of four hydrophobic domains. The proteins mediate signal transduction events that play a role in the regulation of cell development, activation, growth and motility. This encoded protein is a cell surface glycoprotein and may have a role in the control of neurite outgrowth. It is known to complex with integrins. This gene is associated with X-linked mental retardation and neuropsychiatric diseases such as Huntington's chorea, fragile X syndrome and myotonic dystrophy. More recently, it has been identified as a key immune system target in type 1 diabetes.

References

Further reading